James H. Knowlton (August 22, 1813January 29, 1879) was an American politician and lawyer.  He served three terms in the Wisconsin State Assembly.  His brother, Wiram Knowlton, was a justice of the Wisconsin Supreme Court.

Early life and career
Knowlton was born in Canandaigua, New York, in 1813.  His brother and parents moved to the Wisconsin Territory in the 1830s, and he joined them at Janesville in 1838.  He was there only briefly before moving to Mineral Point, and in 1847, he moved to Shullsburg, in Lafayette County.  At Shullsburg he completed his legal studies, was admitted to the bar, and served as the first probate judge of the county.

Political career

He was a member of the legal team defending Judge Levi Hubbell during his 1853 impeachment, and later that year was elected to the Wisconsin State Assembly as a Democrat.  He was not reelected in 1854, but was returned to office again in 1856, this time as a Republican.  Following the 1855 election, however, Knowlton became involved in Republican gubernatorial candidate Coles Bashford's legal challenge of the election results.  Bashford ultimately prevailed and took office in March 1856.

After the 1856 legislative session, Knowlton moved back to Janesville, in Rock County, where he was elected to his third and final Assembly term in 1857.

In 1862, he was a candidate for Wisconsin Supreme Court but was not elected.

Later years

Knowlton moved to Chicago in 1865 and continued his law practice.  He lost his entire library in the Great Chicago Fire of 1871.

He died in 1879 after a long period of illness.

Personal life and family

Knowlton's brother, Wiram Knowlton, was a justice of the Wisconsin Supreme Court.

References

Politicians from Canandaigua, New York
Politicians from Janesville, Wisconsin
People from Shullsburg, Wisconsin
Wisconsin Whigs
19th-century American politicians
Wisconsin lawyers
1813 births
1879 deaths
19th-century American lawyers
Republican Party members of the Wisconsin State Assembly